Madec, is a surname, and may refer to:

Abbot Jean-François Madec (1879-1936), pionnier of social action and ardent defender of the Breton culture
Monseigneur Joseph Madec, emeritus bishop of Toulon
Philippe Madec (1954 - ) French architect and urbanist
René-Marie Madec (1736-1784), Breton sailor and adventurer
Roger Madec (1950-), French politician

Breton-language surnames